Melisa hancocki is a moth of the family Erebidae. It was described by Karl Jordan in 1936. It is found in Uganda.

References

 

Endemic fauna of Uganda
Syntomini
Moths described in 1936
Erebid moths of Africa